Bedwyn railway station serves the village of Great Bedwyn in Wiltshire, England. A bus from the town connects with most trains on Mondays to Saturdays.

History
Bedwyn station was opened on 11 November 1862 by the Great Western Railway company as part of the Berks and Hants Railway from Hungerford to Devizes; the line continues in use as part of the Reading to Taunton Line. In 1900 the Stert and Westbury Railway allowed Devizes to be bypassed, and Westbury became the next major station west of Bedwyn.

This line was closed in 1961.

Facilities
The station has basic facilities including a bus-type shelter on both sides and information screens. The only crossing between platforms is via the road bridge over the railway.

Services
Local trains terminate at Bedwyn, and a crossover and siding at the west of the station allow them to reverse and lay over before returning east.

References

External links

 Bedwyn Trains Passenger Group

Railway stations in Wiltshire
DfT Category F1 stations
Former Great Western Railway stations
Railway stations in Great Britain opened in 1862
Railway stations served by Great Western Railway
1862 establishments in England